A supercurrent is a superconducting current, that is, electric current which flows without dissipation in a superconductor. Under certain conditions, an electric current can also flow without dissipation in microscopically small non-superconducting metals. However, such currents are not called supercurrents, but persistent currents.

See also
 Josephson effect

References

Superconductivity